High commissioners represent India's diplomatic missions in member states of the Commonwealth of Nations and ambassadors represent diplomatic missions in other states. The head of a diplomatic mission to an international organization is called a permanent representative.

Current ambassadors and high commissioners

Ambassadors and High Commissioners

Honorary Consuls

Permanent representatives to international organizations

  – Since March 2005, Indian Ambassador appointed to Ethiopia, with office in Addis Ababa, is also concurrently accredited as the Permanent Representative of India to African Union.
  – Indian Ambassador appointed to Kingdom of Belgium, with office in Brussels, is also concurrently accredited as the Permanent Representative of India to European Union.

Notes

See also
 Foreign relations of India
 List of ambassadors and high commissioners to India
 List of diplomatic missions of India
 List of diplomatic missions in India
 Visa policy of India
 Visa requirements for Indian citizens

References

External links

 List of Indian diplomatic missions - Ministry of External Affairs
 List of Indian Ambassadors to Foreign Countries

 
High Commissioners of India
India